Ladies Room may refer to:

Place
 Women's restroom

Art, entertainment, and media

Film
Ladies Room (1999), 199 film with Nanette Workman
Ladies Room, The Ladies Room, and Ladiesroom, the titles of numerous films listed in IMDb

Music
"Ladies Room", song by Kiss on Rock and Roll Over (1976)
Ladies Room, a visual kei rock band from Japan.

Television
"Ladies Room", Mad Men season one, episode two

Web series
"The Ladies Room" (2007), an  episode of the interactive web-based video series Lonelygirl15